Joanna of Portugal (6 February 1452 – 12 May 1490;) was a Portuguese regent princess of the House of Aviz, daughter of King Afonso V of Portugal and his first wife Isabel of Coimbra. She served as regent during the absence of her father in 1471. She is venerated in the Catholic Church.

Early life 

Joanna was the second child of Afonso, but after the early death of her older brother John in 1451, she was recognized as heir presumptive and given the title of Princess of Portugal. Other children of the king were infantes. Upon the birth of her younger brother, the future John II of Portugal in 1455, she ceased to be heir presumptive, but among the people she continued to be known as Princess Joanna.

From a young age, Joanna expressed a desire to become a nun; however, as she was second-in-line to the throne, her father did not allow it. 

During his military expedition to Tangier in 1471, Joanna served as Regent of the Portuguese Kingdom.

Marriage proposals 

After vehemently refusing several proposals of marriage, Joanna joined the Dominican Convent of Jesus in Aveiro in 1475.  Her brother had, by then, been given an heir, so the family line was no longer in danger of extinction, and thus she entered the convent that same year her nephew was born in 1475. Still, she was compelled several times to leave the convent and return to court. She turned down an offer of marriage from Charles VIII of France, 18 years her junior. Her father abdicated in 1477, died in 1481, and was succeeded by her brother. 

In 1485, she received another offer, from the recently widowed Richard III of England, who was only 8 months younger. This was to be part of a double marital alliance, with his niece Elizabeth of York marrying her cousin, the future Manuel I. However, his death in battle, of which Joanna allegedly had a prophetic dream, halted these plans.

Late life 
She continued to be a great supporter of her brother, John II of Portugal, throughout his reign and her life.

Joanna died on 12 May 1490 in Aveiro and was buried in the Convent of Jesus in Aveiro. She was beatified in 1693 by Pope Innocent XII. In honor of her beatification, an official account of her life was issued in Italian. Although she has not been canonized, in Portugal she is known as the Princess Saint Joanna.

Revival 

In the early 18th century, the Portuguese nobility, clergy, and court had a revival in interest in the princess. During this time, the Portuguese artist Manuel Ferreira e Sousa was the most famous artist in this revival. He was contracted by various religious institutions, noblemen, and even the royal family to paint scenes from her life.

Gallery

Ancestry

Notes

Sources

Dominican Martyrology: May 12
The Portuguese Princess's Dream, Richard III Society - American Branch Web Site. Richard III Society. Retrieved 2010-02-26.

External links

Princes of Portugal
Joan of Portugal
Regents of Portugal
15th-century Portuguese nuns
Portuguese Roman Catholic saints
Roman Catholic royal saints
Joan of Portugal
Joan of Portugal
Joan of Portugal
People from Lisbon
15th-century women rulers
Daughters of kings
Beatifications by Pope Innocent XII